Storms in May (German: Gewitter im Mai) is a 1920 German silent drama film directed by Ludwig Beck. It is based on the novel of the same title by Ludwig Ganghofer. It was made at the Emelka Studios in Munich. A 1938 film Storms in May was adapted from the same story.

Cast
 Fritz Greiner as Domimi 
 Josef Kirchner-Lang
 Rosa Kirchner-Lang
 Ria Mabeck as Samaya 
 Carl René as Poldi 
 Josef Schmitt
 Carl Sick
 Thea Steinbrecher as Dorle 
 Toni Wittels

References

Bibliography
 Bock, Hans-Michael & Bergfelder, Tim. The Concise CineGraph. Encyclopedia of German Cinema. Berghahn Books, 2009.

External links

1920 films
Films of the Weimar Republic
Films directed by Ludwig Beck
German drama films
1920 drama films
German silent feature films
German black-and-white films
Films based on works by Ludwig Ganghofer
Films set in Bavaria
Films set in the Alps
Films shot at Bavaria Studios
Bavaria Film films
Silent drama films
1920s German films
1920s German-language films